Connor Riley-Lowe (born 10 January 1996) is an English professional footballer who plays for Truro City in the Southern Football League as a left back. Connor attended Churston Ferrers Grammar School.

super super con

Club career

Exeter City
Riley-Lowe joined Exeter City's youth setup in 2007, aged 11. He then progressed through the Academy team, being captain in numerous occasions.

Riley-Lowe signed a professional deal with the Grecians on 14 April 2014. He made his first-team debut on 12 August, replacing Craig Woodman in a 0–2 Football League Cup home loss against Bournemouth.

He left the club after the end of the 2016–17 season due to a need to play first-team football. Craig Woodman and Luke Croll were favoured over Riley-Lowe for the left-back position that season by manager Paul Tisdale.

Truro City
On 21 July 2015, Riley-Lowe joined National League South side Truro City on a six-month loan deal. On 8 August he made his debut for Truro in a 1–1 draw against Margate. He scored his first goal in a 2–0 win over St Albans City on 12 September.

Following his release by Exeter City, Riley-Lowe joined Truro City on a permanent basis on 4 August 2017.

Bath City
On 21 June 2019, Riley-Lowe joined Bath City.

Career statistics

References

External links
 

1996 births
Living people
People from Paignton
English footballers
Footballers from Devon
Association football defenders
Exeter City F.C. players
Weymouth F.C. players
Truro City F.C. players
Bath City F.C. players
English Football League players
Southern Football League players
National League (English football) players
People educated at Churston Ferrers Grammar School